Karin Randi Endsjø (born 13 April 1942) is a Norwegian ice sledge racer. She won 1 gold medal, 2 silver medals and 1 bronze medal at the 1984 Paralympic Winter Games. She received a 2009 Erling Stordahl's award.

Career 
At the 1980 Winter Paralympics, she won a silver medal in Women's 800 meters IV, and bronze medals in Women's 100 meters IV, and Women's 500 meters IV.

At the 1984 Winter Paralympics, she won a gold medal in Women's 1000 meters Gr II, silver medals in Women's 500 meters Gr II, and Women's 700 meters Gr II. She won a bronze medal in Women's 100 meters Gr II.

References 

1942 births
Living people
People from Ski, Norway
Paralympic gold medalists for Norway
Paralympic silver medalists for Norway
Paralympic bronze medalists for Norway
Paralympic ice sledge speed racers of Norway
Ice sledge speed racers at the 1980 Winter Paralympics
Ice sledge speed racers at the 1984 Winter Paralympics
Medalists at the 1980 Winter Paralympics
Medalists at the 1984 Winter Paralympics